Saranya Srisakorn (born ) is a retired Thai female volleyball player. 

She was part of the Thailand women's national volleyball team at the 1998 FIVB Volleyball Women's World Championship in Japan, and also at the 2002 FIVB Volleyball Women's World Championship.

References

External links

1975 births
Living people
Saranya Srisakorn
Place of birth missing (living people)
Volleyball players at the 2002 Asian Games
Saranya Srisakorn
Saranya Srisakorn
Saranya Srisakorn